Wendel Eliot Avisado (born May 29, 1953) is a Filipino lawyer and politician who previously served as Secretary of Budget and Management of the Philippines from 2019 to 2021. He was appointed by President Rodrigo Duterte on August 5, 2019, succeeding Undersecretary Janet B. Abuel, who served as the DBM's Officer-in-Charge (OIC) following the appointment of former Secretary Benjamin E. Diokno as Governor of the Bangko Sentral ng Pilipinas. Besides having a long and distinguished career in government service, he is an active member of the Boy Scouts of the Philippines. He previously served as National President of the Boy Scouts of the Philippines from 2017 to 2019 and an ex-officio member of the national executive board.

Personal life and education

Avisado holds a Bachelor of Arts degree in political science at Southern Island College known as (General Baptist Bible College). He is also a cum laude at Ateneo de Davao University with a degree of Bachelor of Laws.

He has attended special local and international training, seminars and workshops in various fields, such as Management Fellowship Program at the university of Brussels; Development Planning at the Asian Institute of Management; Career Executive Service Development Program at the Development Academy of the Philippines; Governance and Local Government Administration in the USA, the People's Republic of China and Indonesia; Urban and Regional Planning at the University of South Australia; Clean Cities Program in the USA and International Conference on Eco2 Cities in Japan.

He is a longtime member of Matina church of Christ in Davao City.

Career

He has served the National Government as Regional Director of the Department of the Interior and Local Government Regions XI and XII from March 1986 to March 1993, and at the same time as Co‐Chair of the Regional Development Council (RDC XI). He advocates for the adoption of a Federal System of Government and champion's people empowerment and participatory development.

He previously taught at the College of Law of the Ateneo de Davao University and at the School of Management of the University of the Philippines, Mindanao Campus. He was a former vice-president for legal and external affairs of the JVA Management Corporation. He was elected No. 1 city councilor of the 1st District of Davao City in 2010 until his appointment as deputy secretary-general of the Housing and Urban Development Coordinating Council (HUDCC) on August 17. He was also the executive director of the Davao Integrated Development Program (DIDP). He was the Davao City administrator from 2004 to 2010 under Mayor Rodrigo Duterte.

He has represented the Boy Scouts of the Philippines in local and international conferences and Scouting events. He was the former chairperson of the ASEAN Scouts Association for Regional Cooperation (ASARC) and the first vice-chairperson of the Asia-Pacific Regional Scout Committee of the World Organization of the Scout Movement (WOSM) from 2012 to 2018.

On November 8, 2016, Avisado was appointed by President Rodrigo Duterte as presidential assistant for Yolanda rehabilitation tasked to oversee the implementation of housing projects for survivors of Typhoon Haiyan (Yolanda).

References

External links

http://www.gmanetwork.com/news/story/383992/news/nation/spare-us-from-controversy-hounding-vp-binay-boy-scouts-ask-public
http://www.philstar.com/nation/488251/davao-city-officials-ordered-suspended
http://newsinfo.inquirer.net/678623/bsp-veep-also-hudcc-exec-under-binay

Secretaries of Budget and Management of the Philippines
Scouting in the Philippines
Living people
Assistants to the President of the Philippines
Duterte administration cabinet members
Benigno Aquino III administration personnel
1953 births